Alfonso Morales (born May 19, 1937) is an American fencer. He competed in the individual and team sabre events at the 1960, 1964, 1968 and 1972 Summer Olympics.

References

External links
 

1937 births
Living people
American male sabre fencers
Olympic fencers of the United States
Fencers at the 1960 Summer Olympics
Fencers at the 1964 Summer Olympics
Fencers at the 1968 Summer Olympics
Fencers at the 1972 Summer Olympics
People from Douglas, Arizona
Pan American Games medalists in fencing
Pan American Games gold medalists for the United States
Fencers at the 1963 Pan American Games